Nsemensoc is a town in central Equatorial Guinea. It is located in the province of Wele-Nzas several kilometres south of Abaamang.

Populated places in Wele-Nzas